3823 Yorii, provisional designation , is a carbonaceous asteroid from the outer region of the asteroid belt, approximately 11 kilometers in diameter.

The asteroid was discovered on 10 March 1988, by Japanese amateur astronomers Masaru Arai and Hiroshi Mori at Yorii Observatory in central Japan. It was named for the Japanese town of Yorii, location of the discovering observatory.

Orbit and classification 

Yorii orbits the Sun in the outer main-belt at a distance of 2.3–3.8 AU once every 5 years and 4 months (1,960 days). Its orbit has an eccentricity of 0.25 and an inclination of 6° with respect to the ecliptic.

Physical characteristics 

Yorii has been characterized as a carbonaceous C-type asteroid by PanSTARRS photometric survey.

Rotation period 

In October 2013, American astronomer Brian Warner obtained a rotational lightcurve of Yorii from photometric observations taken at his Palmer Divide Observatory, Colorado. Lightcurve analysis gave a well-defined rotation period of 6.669 hours with a brightness variation of 0.26 magnitude.

Diameter and albedo 

According to the survey carried out by NASA's Wide-field Infrared Survey Explorer with its subsequent NEOWISE mission, Yorii measures between 9.36 and 12.44 kilometers in diameter, and its surface has an albedo between 0.091 and 0.104. The Collaborative Asteroid Lightcurve Link assumes a standard albedo for carbonaceous asteroids of 0.057 and calculates a diameter of 13.98 kilometers with an absolute magnitude of 13.00.

Naming 

This minor planet was named for Yorii, a Japanese town and location of the discovering Yorii Observatory. Yorii is located in the Ōsato District of the Saitama Prefecture in Japan's central Kantō region. The Dodaira Observatory of Tokyo Astronomical Observatory is also located near Yorii. The official naming citation was published by the Minor Planet Center on 27 August 1988.

References

External links 
 Asteroid Lightcurve Database (LCDB), query form (info )
 Dictionary of Minor Planet Names, Google books
 Asteroids and comets rotation curves, CdR – Observatoire de Genève, Raoul Behrend
 Discovery Circumstances: Numbered Minor Planets (1)-(5000) – Minor Planet Center
 
 

003823
Discoveries by Masaru Arai
Discoveries by Hiroshi Mori (astronomer)
Named minor planets
19880310